Tourism in Venezuela has been developed considerably for decades, particularly because of its geographical position, the variety of landscapes, the richness of plants and wildlife, the artistic expressions and the privileged tropical climate of the country, which affords each region (especially the beaches) throughout the year. Since 2013 the country is having a very severe economic and political crisis affecting tourism all over the country.

Major destinations

Mérida 

Mérida state is a major tourist center in Venezuela. It has an extensive network of hotels not only in the capital city but also throughout the state. In the Méridan páramos, there are good hotels and restaurants. Another place to visit is Mucuchíes, the village of Los Aleros. There is also the National Observatory of Llano del Hato. The city has several museums worth visiting: Beekeeping Museum, Colonial Art Museum, Modern Art Museum, and the Museum of the great Méridan Don Mariano Picón Salas and the Aquarium Garden. Also in the state are hot springs such as Bailadores Las Tapias and la Capellanía Park.

Margarita Island 

Margarita is an island with modern infrastructure, bordered by beaches suitable for extreme sports, and features castles, fortresses and churches of great cultural value. This island is found in the Caribbean Sea and is well known for its pearls.

Caracas 
Caracas is the capital of Venezuela and a world-class cosmopolitan city. In the west of the city, the Libertador municipality, tourism is important in regard to the historic center of the city, the Caracas Cable Car (Ávila mountain Cable Car), the University City of Caracas, Zoos, Sabana Grande Boulevard, among others.

In the east of the city, especially in the Chacao and Baruta municipalities environment of progress and modernism is indisputable, European-style shopping malls, beautiful squares, night clubs, etc. Also the Generalísimo Francisco de Miranda Park, located in the Sucre municipality is heavily of exploitation for tourism.

In the southeast end of city is located a small town, El Hatillo, which has an impeccable colonial town, an atmosphere of peace and tranquility.

To further exploitation of tourism as a factor of endogenous development, the national government has created socio-cultural plans of international concern as the Feria Internacional de Turismo de Caracas (FITCAR), which has been carried held annually since 2005 and promotes tourism in the country, showing to the world the cultural, tourist, traditional, musical and culinary wonders of Venezuela.

Venezuela has some of the most dangerous cities in the world, for example in 2018, there were 2,980 murders in Caracas (99.98 per 100,000 inhabitants), 645 murders in Ciudad Guayana (78.30 per 100,000 inhabitants), and 264 murders in Ciudad Bolívar (69.09 per 100,000 inhabitants).  In Venezuela, under two per cent of reported crimes are prosecuted.

Los Roques and Morrocoy 
The archipelago of Los Roques is formed by a group of islands and cays that make up one of the main tourist attractions of the country. With exotic pristine beaches. Morrocoy is a park, consisting of very small nearby islands to the mainland, which have grown rapidly as one of the biggest tourist attractions in the Caribbean.

Canaima 
About 65% of the park is occupied by rock plateaus called tepuis. These are a unique biological environment, also presenting a great geological interest. Its steep cliffs and waterfalls (including Angel Falls, which is the highest waterfall of the world) are spectacular sceneries.

World Heritage

 Coro: Coro is the oldest city in Venezuela, since it was the first Venezuelan city to be founded in 1527, the city was declared a World Heritage Site of the December 9 of 1993 by UNESCO in the meeting held in the Colombian city of Cartagena. Coro has an interesting history, including was the first federal capital of Venezuela. In 2005 was decreed patrimonial emergency and has been included in the list of World Heritage in Danger, this because of government neglect and intensity of rainfall occurred in recent years. At present the national government undertakes investments to preserve its rich architecture.
 Canaima National Park: It is a national park located in the Bolivar State, Venezuela. It was established the June 12 of 1962 and declared a World Heritage Site by UNESCO in the year 1994.
 University City of Caracas: The main campus of the Central University of Venezuela. It was declared a World Heritage Site by UNESCO in the year 2000. It is a real university, designed by the master Carlos Raúl Villanueva, the University City is primarily a work of art with contemporary architecture and a series of sculptures, murals, paintings and other arts spread throughout the campus university.

Other tourist destinations

Beaches 

Venezuela has many beaches of calm waters and for extreme sports. Besides those already mentioned, the sites most famous for its beauty are:

 Mochima
 Choroní and Chuao
 Los Roques Archipelago
 Coche Island
 Tucacas and Chichiriviche
 La Tortuga Island
 Paraguaná Peninsula
 Catia La Mar
 Cuyagua
 Puerto Cabello
 Bahía de Cata
 San Luis
 Venezuelan Beach Tourism

Jungle and Savannah 

South of Venezuela in the states Bolivar, Amazonas and Delta Amacuro begins the Amazon rainforest, the largest rainforest and the largest nature reserve in the world. This area of the country has great touristic value, because there is the Angel Falls, the highest waterfall of the world; savannah, rivers, forests and tepuis form a ecotourism that has not yet been truly exploited, it is necessary that the national government to promote plans to turn over this Venezuelan soil an essential point for ecotourism in this part of the world.

However, the influx of international tourists in Canaima and the Gran Sabana is high and has been gradually growing, some attractions in forest and savanna in Venezuela are:

 Canaima
 La Gran Sabana
 Angel Falls
 Mount Roraima
 Orinoco River
 Auyán-tepui
 Caroní River
 El Abismo
 Sapo Falls
 Tobogán de Agua (Water Slide)

Mountain 

Although Venezuela is dominated by plains and tropical temperatures, with the Andes which are beginning in Venezuela it has also a mountain range of great tourist attraction. Mérida state consists mainly of páramo vegetation, low temperatures, snow filled peaks, glaciers and high mountains of the Venezuelan Andes. Some of the Venezuelan mountain attractions are:

 Sierra Nevada de Mérida
 Peak Bolívar
 Mérida Cable Car
 Peak Espejo
 Peak Humboldt
 Sierra La Culata
 Batallón and La Negra Páramos
 Cerro El Ávila
 El Ávila Cable Car
 Chorro San Miguel (waterfall)
 Mucubají Lagoon
 Del Vino Waterfall in Dinira National Park
 Among other Andean highlands, located in the states of Mérida, Trujillo and Táchira:
 Monumento a la Virgen de la Paz
 Plateau La Galera Natural Monument

Los Llanos 

Los Llanos is a region of Venezuela consisting of plains with few elevations, dominated by plateaus, hills, lakes and pastures. The climate is warm. This region has an average tourist reception, but it is an important site for the rural vacation, covering most of the states Apure, Barinas, Cojedes, Portuguesa, Guárico, Anzoátegui, Monagas and Delta Amacuro. In these rural plains are flora, fauna, livestock culture and typical features of the autochthonous culture of Venezuela combined. The higher mountain elevations of this Venezuelan region are in San Juan de los Morros.

Others 
 Médanos de Coro (Coro's dunes)
 Cave of the Oilbirds
 Planeta Zoo
 Hundición Yay

Cities 

 Coro
 Mérida
 Maracaibo
 Caracas
 Barquisimeto
 Puerto La Cruz
 Valencia
 Pampatar - Porlamar
 Puerto Cabello
 Calabozo
 Juan Griego
 Cumaná
 Ciudad Bolívar
 Tovar
 Ciudad Guayana
 Tinaquillo
 Acarigua
 San Cristóbal
 Barinas
 Guanare

Towns 

 Colonia Tovar
 Galipán
 Punto Fijo
 Jají
 Bailadores
 Barlovento
 Apartaderos
 Mucuchíes
 Caripe
 San Antonio del Golfo
 Turén
 Naiguatá

There in Venezuela 

 43 National Parks
 22 Natural Monuments
 3 sites considered World Heritage Site

Venezuelan cuisine 
The Venezuelan cuisine varies by region of the country, however, the most typical dishes of national cuisine are: pabellón criollo, asado negro, reina pepeada, sancocho, mondongo, especially arepas or cachapas.

Music of Venezuela 

The music genres in the various regions are: Joropo or Llanera music (from Los Llanos region of livestock culture, its lyrics are messages that express the values of the llaneran people, of European and Indigenous origin music genre, its subgenres are: Pasaje, Joropo central or Joropo tuyero, Joropo oriental, Joropo guayanés, Golpe tocuyano, Quirpa, Joropo llanero), Tambor (Afro-descendent music of mostly of Venezuelan coasts), Gaita Zuliana (the national Christmas music genre, from Zulia state, the topics covered in this genre range from love songs and religious figures to humorous and reporting issues. The political element is also starring in many subjects), Changa tuki (from Caracas; is an urban way of life, a form of electronic music that comprises dance, own urban clothing and music; the most representative is its dance, it is difficult and showy, recommended to watch, dance competences are made in different "matinees", its dancers are known as "tuki"; use hair's wicks yellow painted, red tight pants), Calypso made by Caribbean origin people in Southern Venezuela. Also there is urban music such as salsa, reggaeton, Venezuelan rock, Venezuelan hip hop, Venezuelan ska, Venezuelan electronic, Venezuelan pop, Venezuelan classical, etc.

Travel requisites: 

 To enter the country a valid passport issued in the country of origin and return passage is required. Some countries may need a Visa.
 No special vaccinations are required to enter the country. Those traveling to jungle areas or want more protection can be vaccinated against yellow fever, malaria and cholera, after medical advice. It is advisable to take precautions to get vaccinated if it visit places like the Amazon rainforest or the Gran Sabana.
 In most of the country the weather is hot, but bearable. It is suggested to bring light clothing, but it is always good to include a sweater or light jacket. If the destination is the Venezuelan Andes, it is important to bring warm clothes, if possible balaclavas, caps and/or gloves .
 Most of the tourists arrive at Maiquetía Simón Bolívar International Airport, but there are another 5 airports in some cities of the country, covering international destinations.

Money exchange 
Currently in Venezuela there is an exchange control imposed by the national government since 2003. The exchange rate varies following government directives, but due to the economical crisis, rules and policies may change frequently. Moreover, there is a foreign exchange market called "parallel market" or "black market"; the prices of the dollar in this market can be very different compared with the government exchange rate.

Weather 
Weather changes in Venezuela by region are drastic, example, in the Médanos de Coro temperatures can reach up to 40 °C, but in Méridan moors or the Sierra Nevada temperatures may be less than 0 °C.

References

External links
 

 
Venezuela